Giampaolo Medei (born 14 December 1973) is an Italian professional volleyball coach. Since the 2022–23 season, he serves as head coach for the Polish PlusLiga team, Asseco Resovia.

Honours

Clubs
 CEV Champions League
  2017/2018 – with Cucine Lube Civitanova

 FIVB Club World Championship
  Poland 2018 – with Cucine Lube Civitanova

 CEV Cup
  2016/2017 – with Tours VB

 CEV Challenge Cup
  2020/2021 – with Ziraat Bankası Ankara

 National championships
 2017/2018  Italian Championship, with Cucine Lube Civitanova
 2020/2021  Turkish Championship, with Ziraat Bankası Ankara

References

External links
 
 Coach profile at LegaVolley.it 
 Coach profile at Volleybox.net

1973 births
Living people
People from the Province of Macerata 
Italian volleyball coaches
Volleyball coaches of international teams
Italian expatriate sportspeople in France
Italian expatriate sportspeople in Turkey
Italian expatriate sportspeople in Poland
Resovia (volleyball) coaches